Kjerulfia is an extinct genus of trilobite in the family Holmiidae. There are at least two described species in Kjerulfia.

Species
These two species belong to the genus Kjerulfia:
 † Kjerulfia lata Kiaer, 1917
 † Kjerulfia orienta (Orlowski, 1974)

References

Olenelloidea
Articles created by Qbugbot